Pullman–Moscow, WA–ID CSA is the United States Census Bureau's official name for the combined statistical area in the northwest United States that includes the Pullman micropolitan area (all of Whitman County, Washington) and the Moscow micropolitan area (all of Latah County, Idaho). The combined population of the two counties was 87,490 as of the 2020 census, and estimated at 88,186 in 2021.

Outside of these two cities, the two counties are predominantly rural and agricultural. The CSA is the center of the Palouse region, a former prairie characterized by its dune-like hills. The cities of Moscow and Pullman are roughly four miles apart, and are connected by Washington State Route 270, more commonly known as the Moscow-Pullman Highway.

Demographics

References

Whitman County, Washington
Latah County, Idaho
Combined statistical areas of the United States